Coleophora borea is a moth of the family Coleophoridae. It is found in the United States, including Ohio.

The larvae feed on the seeds of Fallopia scandens. They create a trivalved, tubular silken case.

References

borea
Moths described in 1921
Moths of North America